Andrei Borisovich Troschinsky (February 14, 1978 – December 21, 2015) was a Kazakh professional ice hockey player, who played for Kazakhstan National Hockey Team at the 1999 Asian Winter Games. Troschinsky was a graduate of the Ust-Kamenogorsk ice hockey school. He was drafted 170th overall in the sixth round of the 1998 NHL Entry Draft by St. Louis Blues, but never signed a contract or participated in a game with them. He was the younger brother of Alexei Troschinsky.

Death
In the morning of 21 December 2015, Troschinsky felt unwell upon waking up and called an ambulance; while in the vehicle he had a heart attack and died.

Career statistics

Regular season and playoffs

International

References

External links
 

1978 births
2015 deaths
Arlan Kokshetau players
Kazakhstani ice hockey centres
St. Louis Blues draft picks
Sportspeople from Oskemen
Kazzinc-Torpedo players
Worcester IceCats players
Metallurg Magnitogorsk players
HK Acroni Jesenice players
Saryarka Karagandy players
Barys Nur-Sultan players
Yertis Pavlodar players
Olympic ice hockey players of Kazakhstan
Ice hockey players at the 2006 Winter Olympics
Kazakhstani expatriate ice hockey people
Asian Games gold medalists for Kazakhstan
Asian Games silver medalists for Kazakhstan
Medalists at the 1999 Asian Winter Games
Medalists at the 2003 Asian Winter Games
Medalists at the 2007 Asian Winter Games
Ice hockey players at the 1999 Asian Winter Games
Ice hockey players at the 2003 Asian Winter Games
Ice hockey players at the 2007 Asian Winter Games
Asian Games medalists in ice hockey
Kazakhstani expatriate sportspeople in the United States
Kazakhstani expatriate sportspeople in Slovenia
Kazakhstani expatriate sportspeople in Russia
Expatriate ice hockey players in Slovenia
Expatriate ice hockey players in the United States
Expatriate ice hockey players in Russia